The Grand Canyon of the Elwha is a deep canyon on the Elwha River located below Dodger Point approximately  upstream from the now-drained Lake Mills in Washington, United States.

The canyon is traversed by the Dodger Point Bridge, as it exits the canyon and just above Humes Ranch Cabin.

References
National Park Service

Landforms of Clallam County, Washington
Valleys of Washington (state)